Annick Le Thomas (née Hommay; born June 21, 1936) is a French botanist, best known for her work in the field of pollen analysis. She is a recognised expert on the Annonaceae family of flowering plants.

References 

1936 births
Living people
20th-century French botanists
20th-century French women scientists